Thomas Creswick  (5 February 181128 December 1869) was a British landscapist and illustrator, and one of the best-known members of the Birmingham School of landscapists.

Biography
Creswick was born in Sheffield (at the time it was within Derbyshire). He was the son of Thomas Creswick and Mary Epworth and educated at Hazelwood, near Birmingham.

According to the Encyclopædia Britannica Eleventh Edition (1911):

Creswick has paintings in numerous British collections and in the Yale Center for British Art.

References

External links
Creswick online (ArtCyclopedia)
A drover and his herd crossing a ford (Christie's)
An English Merrymaking a Hundred Years Ago (1847 collaboration with W P Frith - Christie's)

1811 births
1869 deaths
Artists from Sheffield
19th-century English painters
English male painters
English illustrators
Landscape artists
Royal Academicians
19th-century English male artists